The 1977–78 Athenian League season was the 55th in the history of Athenian League. The league consisted of 18 teams.

Clubs
The league featured 8 clubs which competed in the previous season Division One and 10 new teams:
 7 promoted from last season's Division Two:
 Chalfont St.Peter  (5th)
 Harefield United  (6th)
 Uxbridge  (7th)
 Edgware  (9th)
 Kingsbury Town  (11th)
 Windsor & Eton  (13th)
 Chertsey Town  (15th)
 3 joined the division:
 Billericay Town, from Essex Senior League
 Hoddesdon Town, from London Spartan League Division One
 Burnham, from Hellenic League Premier Division

League table

References

1977–78 in English football leagues
Athenian League